The 2000–01 Liga Bet season saw Maccabi Ironi Shlomi, Hapoel Asi Gilboa, Hapoel Tira and Ironi Ofakim win their regional divisions and promoted to Liga Alef.

Second placed club, Beitar Kiryat Gat, were also promoted as the best runners-up in the South divisions, after a vacancy was created in Liga Alef South division.

At the bottom, Hapoel Bnei Kafr Yasif, Beitar Safed, Ironi I'billin (from North A division), Hapoel Arab Nujeidat, Beitar Iksal, Ironi Sayid Umm al-Fahm (from North B division), Maccabi Bnei Tira, Maccabi Kafr Qasim (from South A division) and Hapoel Rahat (from South B division) were all automatically relegated to Liga Gimel.

North A Division

North B Division

South A Division
Promoted to Liga Alef:
Hapoel Tira

Other league clubs:
Hapoel Azor
Beitar Ramat Gan
Hapoel Mahane Yehuda
Hapoel Hod HaSharon
M.M. Giv'at Shmuel
Hapoel Kafr Qasim
Beitar Nes Tubruk
Maccabi HaShikma Ramat Hen
Shimshon Bnei Tayibe
Maccabi Yehud
Beitar Holon

Relegated to Liga Gimel:
Maccabi Bnei Tira
Maccabi Kafr Qasim

Hapoel Jaljulia and Hapoel Or Yehuda were originally set to play in the division. Hapoel Jaljulia which finished runners-up in the previous season, were promoted to Liga Alef in order to fill a vacated spot in that league. Hapoel Or Yehuda which were relegated from Liga Alef in the previous season, withdrew from the league.

South B Division

Maccabi Jerusalem/Ma'ale Adumim and Sektzia Nes Tziona were originally set to play in the division. Maccabi Jerusalem/Ma'ale Adumim which finished runners-up in the previous season, were promoted to Liga Alef in order to fill a vacated spot in that league. Sektzia Nes Tziona which were due to be relegated from Liga Alef in the previous season, were eventually reprieved from relegation.

References
Liga Bet North, 00-01 One 
Liga Bet North B, 00-01 One 
Liga Bet South B, 00-01  One 

Liga Bet seasons
5
Israel